Aheu Deng Kudum (born November 28, 1986) is a beauty queen and fashion model from South Sudan. She won the title of Miss Earth South Sudan 2009 at the annual beauty pageant, organized by South Sudan's Ministry of Tourism and Beauties of Africa Inc, the exclusive franchise holder.

Miss Earth South Sudan 2009
Aheu Deng was born in Itang (Ethiopian District), which was a South Sudan rebel camp, and won the Beauties of Miss Earth South Sudan 2009 pageant on June 10, 2009. She inherited the crown from Nok Duany, who held the 2008 Beauties of South Sudan title by virtue of the franchise holders appointment.

Aheu Deng speaks five different languages including English, Swahili and some Arabic. She also speaks the indigenous South Sudan languages of Dinka, which is her mother tongue, and the Acholi dialect, both of which are Nilotic languages. She had to drop out of high school and did not finish her education due to being forced to marry a stranger whilst living in Kakuma Refugee Camp in Northern Kenya. At the age of 15, she became a survivor of the Kakuma Refugee Camp and forced marriage. She is the eldest of four girls and was raised by a single mother after her father General Deng Kudum was killed on May 8, 1992, when he led a Sudan People Liberation Army (SPLA) rebel attack on Juba, Sudan. General Gen Kudum was one of nine Bor Dinka brothers killed in the war of independence against North Sudan.

World's Tallest Beauty Queen
Her feat has been submitted to the Guinness World Records for inclusion and certification as the World's Tallest Beauty Queen.

Her managers received numerous television show appearance requests for her after she won the title of Miss South Sudan in 2009.

In 2010, she turned down an opportunity to do a world tour covering Asia, Europe and South America as a spokesperson for South Sudan, following the Miss Earth 2009 pageant. She started the Miss South Sudan Foundation in 2011 to advocate women's causes, and to speak against child marriage, of which she was a victim herself. She also is a business entrepreneur.

Miss Earth 2009
Aheu Deng represented South Sudan in the 9th edition of the Miss Earth beauty pageant, which was held at the Boracay Ecovillage Resort and Convention Center on the Island of Boracay, Philippines, on 1 November 2009, with its final on November 22, 2009.

See also
Miss Earth 
Miss Earth 2009
Miss South Sudan

References

External links

Miss Earth official website
Woman of the Earth

1986 births
Living people
People from Jonglei State
Miss Earth 2009 contestants
South Sudanese beauty pageant winners
South Sudanese female models